Rhinella nesiotes is a species of toad in the family Bufonidae that is endemic to Peru. Its natural habitats are subtropical or tropical moist lowland forests and subtropical or tropical moist montane forests. It is threatened by habitat loss.

References

nesiotes
Amphibians of Peru
Amphibians described in 1979
Endemic fauna of Peru
Taxonomy articles created by Polbot